Hamida Mohammad Ali was a member of the National Assembly of Pakistan and the first wife of Mohammad Ali Bogra, prime minister of Pakistan.

Career 
Ali was elected to the National Assembly of Pakistan in 1962 unopposed after the death of her husband, Mohammad Ali Bogra.

Personal life 
Ali was married to Mohammad Ali Bogra. He married  Aliya Begum, Lebanese national, as second wife which offended Hamida. His second marriage was controversial in Pakistan. Hamida was rumored to be murdered by either her own son, Hamde Ali, or by a worker after a domestic conflict.

References 

Pakistani MNAs 1962–1965
Spouses of prime ministers of Pakistan
Bogra family
20th-century Pakistani women politicians